Richard Bayard Dominick (September 17, 1919 - May 4, 1976) was an American  ophthalmologist, outdoorsman, and amateur lepidopterist. He is best known for his extensive collection of moths and butterflies in South Carolina. He established the Wedge Entomology Research Foundation for the publication of a series of monographs entitled the Moths of America North of Mexico.

Early life

He was born at the family plantation Gregorie Neck on the Coosawhatchie River in Jasper County, South Carolina. As a youth, he collected moths and butterflies in the area.

He attended Yale University as a member of Davenport College and was on the Yale college crew. He began to study premedical courses to become a physician.

In 1941, his life changed dramatically. The death of his father led to the sale of the family plantation. His early moth collection was donated to the American Museum of Natural History. He joined the Marine Corps as an aviator. During the war he flew a Douglas SBD Dauntless dive bomber in the Pacific. He was awarded the Air Medal and the Purple Heart.

After the war, he resumed his studies. He earned his medical degree at Columbia University. He did a surgical residency at Roosevelt Hospital and practiced at the Manhattan Eye, Ear and Throat Hospital.

Outside of his practice, he became an honorary life member of the Peabody Associates and the Explorers Club. He was a scoutmaster of a Boy Scout troop in Far Rockaway, New York for four years.

Lepidoptery

On a visit to South Carolina, he rediscovered his boyhood interest in moths and butterflies. Looking at Alexander Barrett Klots' Field Guide to the Butterfly, he recognized specimens that he had collected as a youth.

He and his wife Tatiana purchased the Wedge Plantation near McClellanville, South Carolina. He dedicated himself to collecting and studying moths and butterflies. He built a laboratory with large "bug trap" for the collection of moths. He developed photographic techniques to record his specimens. He discovered new species including Dasychira dominickaria.

During this ten-year period, Dominick collected over 25,000 moths and 1,000 butterflies on the plantation. The Richard B. Dominick Moth and Butterfly Collection with over 1,100 species resides in the McKissick Museum at the University of South Carolina in Columbia, South Carolina.

Richard Dominick established the Wedge Entomological Research Foundation for the publication of a series of monographs entitled the Moths of North America North of Mexico.

He was a named a fellow of the Royal Entomological Society of London.

References

American lepidopterists
1919 births
1976 deaths
Yale College alumni
Columbia University Vagelos College of Physicians and Surgeons alumni
Fellows of the Royal Entomological Society
Recipients of the Air Medal
20th-century American zoologists
People from Jasper County, South Carolina
People from McClellanville, South Carolina
American ophthalmologists